In the 1966–67 season of Atlantic Coast Conference men's basketball, the North Carolina Tar Heels team finished in the top position. The same team won the ACC Championship, and won the regional final of the NCAA tournament, reaching the semi-final of the national event.

Final standings

ACC tournament
See 1967 ACC men's basketball tournament

NCAA tournament

Regional semifinal
North Carolina 78, Princeton 70

Regional final
North Carolina 96, Boston College 80

National semifinal
Dayton 76, North Carolina 62

National third-place game
Houston 84, North Carolina 62

ACC's NCAA record
2-2

NIT

Quarterfinals
Southern Illinois 72, Duke 63

External links
 Info at Sports-Reference.com